Isanda coronata is a species of sea snail, a marine gastropod mollusk in the family Trochidae, the top snails.

Description
The size of the shell varies between 4 mm and 10 mm. The small, solid, umbilicated shell has a depressed-turbinate shape. It is polished, pinkish-white, with oblique, undulating grayish-pink longitudinal stripes. The low spire is conic. The apex is acute. The sutures are deeply channelled, bordered by a corona of tubercles or beads . The shell contains 5 whorls. The large body whorl is rounded or subangular at the circumference and convex beneath. The aperture is higher than wide, slightly oblique and quadrangular. The umbilicus is very deep, rather cylindrical, bordered by a deeply crenated white marginal rib, with a narrower beaded cingulus just outside it.

This is a compact, depressed little shell, with diamond-shaped aperture, showing in fresh specimens a slight trace of pearl within. Adams describes the color as spotted with brown in transverse series, with transverse whitish lines, and a wide subsutural white band. The coloration is very inconstant. The columella is straight, a trifle expanded above,
connected with the upper lip by a thin parietal callus.

Distribution
This species is endemic to Australia and occurs off Western Australia, the Northern Territory and Torres Strait.

References

  Arthur Adams, A monograph on Isanda, a new genus of Trochidae allied to Umbonium; Proceedings of the Zoological Society of London pt. 21-23 (1853-1855)
 Adams, H. & Adams, A. 1854. The genera of Recent Mollusca arranged according to their organization. London : John Van Voorst Vol. 1 pp. 257–484
 Robertson, R. 1985. Archaeogastropod biology and the systematics of the genus Tricolia (Trochacea: Tricoliidae) in the Indo-West Pacific. Monographs of Marine Mollusca 3: 1-103. page(s): 21

External links
 To Barcode of Life (1 barcode)
 To Biodiversity Heritage Library (11 publications)
 To GenBank (5 nucleotides; 1 proteins)
 To World Register of Marine Species
 

coronata
Gastropods of Australia
Gastropods described in 1854